Washington Galvão Junior (born 5 June 1989) is a Brazilian football player. His last club was KS Apolonia Fier.

External links 
 

Brazilian footballers
1989 births
Living people
Association football forwards
KF Apolonia Fier players